The 1996 S.League was the 1st season of the S.League, the top professional football league in Singapore.

The S.League came into existence as a result of a fragmenting of relations between Singapore and Malaysian football associations. A dispute over the division of gate receipts for the Singapore representative in the Malaysian Premier League saw Singapore withdraw from the competition in 1995, ending a footballing connection between the two nations that stretched back to 1921, with the first participation of a Singapore team in the Malaya Cup.

The semi-professional FAS Premier League was founded in 1988, but had failed to find support amongst the local communities and media. The S.League was therefore created to fill the need to have a fully professional football league within Singapore. The Football Association of Singapore invited applications for clubs to compete in the newly formed league. Eight successful applications were made, these eight teams took part in a two-stage league season, with the winner of each stage qualifying for the end of season championship decider. The first half of the season was known as the Tiger Beer Series and the second half was known as the Pioneer Series.

Geylang United defeated Singapore Armed Forces FC in the end of season championship Playoff to be crowned the 1st S.League champions.

Clubs
Eight sides took part in the first S.League campaign; two of whom had been competitors in the former Singapore Premier League. These former Premier League clubs were Balestier United FC who changed their name upon joining the S.League to Balestier Central and the former Singapore Premier League powerhouse Geylang International, winners of six back-to-back Premier League titles, who renamed themselves Geylang United for the first S.League season. The rest were clubs drawn from the amateur National Football League: Police, Singapore Armed Forces, Tampines Rovers, Tiong Bahru United and Wellington Football Club, who renamed themselves Woodlands Wellington.

Sembawang Rangers were formed from a merger between two NFL sides, Gibraltar Crescent and Sembawang Sports Club.

Foreign players

League tables

Series 1 (Tiger Beer Series)

Series 2 (Pioneer Series)

S.League Championship Playoff

The Geylang United victory in the Championship Playoff saw them qualify for the 1997–98 Asian Club Championship. This was the first Singaporean representation in the Asian Club Championship since 1991–92, when Geylang International participated in 1st Round qualifying. Geylang were comfortably defeated by 1996 J.League champions Kashima Antlers in the first round of the East Asian half of the competition, Kashima finishing with an 8–2 aggregate win.

Top scorers

References

Singapore Premier League seasons
1
Sing
Sing